Somogy was an administrative county (comitatus) of the Kingdom of Hungary. Its territory, which was slightly larger than that of present Somogy county, is now in south-western Hungary. The capital of the county was Kaposvár.

Geography
Somogy County shared borders with the Hungarian counties of Zala, Veszprém, Tolna, Baranya, Verőce and Belovár-Körös (the latter two part of Croatia-Slavonia). It extended along the southern shore of Lake Balaton and encompassed the region south of the lake. The river Drava (Hungarian: Dráva) formed most of its southern border. Its area was 6530 km2 around 1910.

History
In the 10th century, the Hungarian Nyék tribe occupied the region around Lake Balaton, mainly the areas which are known today as Zala and Somogy counties. Somogy County arose as one of the first comitatuses of the Kingdom of Hungary, in the 11th century.

Demographics

1900
In 1900, the county had a population of 345,586 people and was composed of the following linguistic communities:

Total:

 Hungarian: 310,320 (89.8%)
 German: 20,193 (5.8%)
 Croatian: 11,641 (3.4%)
 Romanian: 381 (0.1%)
 Slovak: 291 (0.1%)
 Serbian: 28 (0.0%)
 Ruthenian: 8 (0.0%)
 Other or unknown: 2,724 (0.8%)

According to the census of 1900, the county was composed of the following religious communities:

Total:

 Roman Catholic: 251,246 (72.7%)
 Calvinist: 65,621 (19.0%)
 Lutheran: 17,481 (5.1%)
 Jewish: 10,969 (3.2%)
 Unitarian: 81 (0.0%)
 Greek Catholic: 77 (0.0%)
 Greek Orthodox: 66 (0.0%)
 Other or unknown: 45 (0.0%)

1910

In 1910, the county had a population of 365,961 people and was composed of the following linguistic communities:

Total:

 Hungarian: 333,597 (91.2%)
 German: 18,718 (5.1%)
 Croatian: 9,934 (2.7%)
 Slovak: 364 (0.1%)
 Serbian: 44 (0.0%)
 Romanian: 63 (0.0%)
 Ruthenian: 4 (0.0%)
 Other or unknown: 3,237 (0.9%)

According to the census of 1910, the county was composed of the following religious communities:

Total:

 Roman Catholic: 273,650 (74.8%)
 Calvinist: 63,569 (17.4%)
 Lutheran: 17,700 (4.9%)
 Jewish: 10,645 (2.9%)
 Greek Orthodox: 129 (0.0%)
 Greek Catholic: 106 (0.0%)
 Unitarian: 104 (0.0%)
 Other or unknown: 58 (0.0%)

The city of Siófok, which was in Somogy county before the 1850s, reverted from Veszprém county to Somogy county before World War II. After World War II, the district of Szigetvár went to Baranya county.

Subdivisions
In the early 20th century, the subdivisions of Somogy county were:

References

States and territories established in 1715
1596 disestablishments
States and territories disestablished in 1946
Counties in the Kingdom of Hungary
History of Somogy